The Steinschartenkopf is a rocky peak, 2,615 m, in the Hochlicht range in the Allgäu Alps. It is located between the Wilder Mann to the north and the Hohes Licht to the south and is the sixth highest summit in the Allgäu Alps. The popular Heilbronn Way (Heilbronner Weg) runs over the summit.

Ascent 
The Steinschartenkopf is usually only climbed as part of a hike along the Heilbronn Way. As a destination in its own right it is of limited interest, but it is the highest point on the whole of the Heilbronn Way. From the direction of the Rappensee Hut the only ladder of the mountain path runs up to the summit. After a few metres further, a ladder bridge leads to the path in the direction of the Socktalscharte col.

Literature 

Dieter Seibert: Allgäuer Alpen Alpin, Alpine Club Guide. Munich, Bergverlag Rudolf Rother, 2004. 
Alpine Club map 1:25,000 series, Sheet 2/1, Allgäuer- Lechtaler Alpen, West

External links 

 Photographs of the Steinschartenkopf

Two-thousanders of Austria
Mountains of the Alps
Mountains of Tyrol (state)
Allgäu Alps